{{Infobox martial artist
| name            = Nam Phan
| other_names     =
| image           = 
| image_size      = 200px
| alt             =
| caption         =
| birth_name      =
| birth_date      = 
| birth_place     = Oakland, California, United States
| death_date      =
| death_place     =
| death_cause     =
| residence       =
| nationality     = American
| weight          = 145 lb
| height          = 
| weight_class    = Bantamweight Featherweight  Lightweight
| reach         = 
| stance          = 
| fighting_out_of = East Oakland Cuh , California, United States
| team            = Nam Phan MMA AcademyTeam Alpha Male
| rank            = 2nd Degree Black Belt in Việt Quyền Đạo   Black Belt in Karate   Black Belt in Judo Black Belt in Brazilian jiu-jitsu 
| years_active    =
| box_win         = 3
| box_kowin       = 2
| box_loss        = 8
| box_koloss      = 1
| box_draw        = 1
| mma_kowin       = 8
| mma_subwin      = 6
| mma_decwin      = 7
| mma_koloss      = 4
| mma_subloss     = 3
| mma_decloss     = 10
| mma_draw        =
| mma_nc          =
| url             =
| boxrec          = 359125
| sherdog         = 5778
| footnotes       =
| updated         =
}}

Nhat Nam Si Phan (born March 13, 1983), better known as Nam Phan, is an American retired mixed martial artist and professional boxer. A professional in mixed martial arts since 2001, Phan has also competed for the UFC, WEC, Strikeforce, World Victory Road, and was a contestant on The Ultimate Fighter: Team GSP vs. Team Koscheck. He has competed in Japanese MMA organization Pancrase and won the title of King of Pancrase in the featherweight division in 2015.

Background
Born and raised in California, Phan began training in Tae Kwon Do at the age of four. A few years later, Phan began karate and did that for eight years earning his black belt. By the age of 16, he had earned a second degree black belt in Việt Quyền Đạo, a Vietnamese combat martial art. Phan then began studying Brazilian jiu-jitsu in the year 2000 earning his black belt  He is also a professional boxer with a record of 3-8-1.

Mixed martial arts career

Early career
Phan made his professional mixed martial arts debut against Jason Maxwell in October 2001, and won due to a second-round TKO. He then won his following three fights also, before tasting defeat at the hands of Rob McCullough in April 2003. In December 2006, and now with a 12–2 record, he made his promotional debut with Strikeforce against Josh Thomson at Strikeforce: Triple Threat. He lost via unanimous decision, however, and was also defeated in his next, and last, Strikeforce fight against Billy Evangelista at Strikeforce: Melendez vs. Thomson.

He then won the Extreme Fighters World Championships by defeating Shad Smith via TKO at 1:11 of the first round on October 6, 2007.

In 2009, he took part in the Sengoku Raiden Championship's Featherweight Grand Prix where he defeated Hideki Kadowaki in the opening round. In the second round, at Sengoku 8, Phan was defeated by Michihiro Omigawa.

The Ultimate Fighter
Phan signed with the Ultimate Fighting Championship to appear on The Ultimate Fighter: Team GSP vs. Team Koscheck. On the debut episode, Phan defeated Mike Budnik via TKO after a liver shot and follow-up punches. Phan therefore earned entrance into the house, where he would be picked for Team Koscheck as Koscheck's fifth pick (ninth overall).

In the preliminary fight, Phan fought Spencer Paige, winning via unanimous decision to give Koscheck's team their first win. The first round was closely contested until the final seconds where Phan got a takedown, ground and pounded, and then applied a kimura. In between rounds, Paige told his corner that his left foot was broken. Phan would go on to continue pressuring Paige in the second round to win the fight.

For his quarter-final fight, Phan was selected to fight Cody McKenzie. Phan defeated McKenzie via TKO (punches) in round 2, securing his spot in the semi-finals. In the semi-final round, Phan faced Michael Johnson. In a back-and-forth fight, Johnson scored takedowns. The consensus at the fight was that Johnson won the opening round, whilst Phan won the second. The third round, however, was argued over, with the coach of each respective fighter believing that their fighter took it. Johnson was declared the winner via split decision.

Ultimate Fighting Championship
Phan was expected to face Alex Caceres on December 4, 2010, at The Ultimate Fighter: Team GSP vs. Team Koscheck Finale. However, Caceres was forced out of the bout with an injury and replaced by Leonard Garcia. Phan lost the fight against Garcia via a controversial split decision. Due to the controversy surrounding the decision, both fighters were awarded a win bonus by the UFC and the fight earned Fight of the Night honors. The loss was named as 2010 Robbery of the Year by many MMA websites, most notably by Sherdog.com.

A rematch with Garcia was expected on March 26, 2011, at UFC Fight Night 24. However, Phan was forced out of the bout with an injury and was replaced by Chan Sung Jung.

Phan faced Mike Brown on August 6, 2011, at UFC 133. He lost the fight via unanimous decision.

Phan was expected to face Matt Grice on October 8, 2011, at UFC 136, replacing an injured Josh Grispi.  However, Grice was forced out of the bout with an injury with Leonard Garcia stepping in to replace him. Phan won via unanimous decision, also earning both fighters Fight of the Night bonuses.

Phan next faced Jimy Hettes on December 30, 2011, at UFC 141. Phan was dominated by Hettes throughout the fight, unable to stop the many takedowns of his opponent and losing via unanimous decision.

Phan was briefly linked to a bout with Zhang Tie Quan on February 26, 2012, at UFC 144.  However, for unknown reasons, the bout never materialized.

Phan faced Cole Miller on August 4, 2012, at UFC on FOX 4 and won a split decision.

Phan faced Dennis Siver on December 8, 2012, at UFC on Fox 5, replacing an injured Eddie Yagin. Nam went into the fight with a passive posture, and proceeded to be dominated through the entire three rounds in both stand up and ground games, ultimately losing by unanimous decision. One of the judges scored 10-8 in favor of Siver on all three rounds.

Phan fought Takeya Mizugaki in a Bantamweight bout on December 7, 2013, at UFC Fight Night 33.
He lost the fight via unanimous decision.

Phan faced Vaughan Lee on March 1, 2014, at The Ultimate Fighter: China Finale. He lost the fight via unanimous decision and was subsequently released from the promotion.

Post-UFC career
In his first fight post-UFC, Phan faced Kenichi Ito at Grandslam MMA: Way of the Cage on July 13, 2014. He won the fight via first-round TKO.

Phan then faced Yuki Baba at Pancrase 261 on October 5, 2014. Phan won the fight via rear-naked choke submission in the first round.

Bellator MMA
On October 17, 2014, it was announced that Phan has signed with Bellator.  He made his debut for the promotion against Mike Richman on November 15, 2014, at Bellator 131. Phan lost the fight via knockout in the first round.

Retirement
On March 12, 2017, after his loss to Whiteford, Phan announced his retirement from MMA competition.

Personal life
Phan takes pride in his Vietnamese heritage and is part of the Vietnamese-American community. He proudly displays both the American and South Vietnamese flags on his gi'' as a symbol of his pride in the freedom of his current home and of his lost homeland. Phan owns and runs the Madu Academy, where he teaches Brazilian jiu-jitsu as well as boxing and Muay Thai. In 2005, Phan co-founded Ma Du Entertainment, a business to promote mixed martial arts fighters.

Championships and accomplishments
Ultimate Fighting Championship
Fight of the Night (Two times) vs. Leonard Garcia
Pancrase Hybrid Wrestling
King of Pancrase Featherweight Championship (1 Time)

Mixed martial arts record

|-
| Loss
| align=center| 21–17
| Robert Whiteford
| Technical Submission (front choke)
| |ACB 54: Supersonic
| 
| align=center| 1
| align=center| 0:29
| Manchester, England
|
|-
| Loss
| align=center| 21–16
| Masakazu Imanari
| Submission (heel hook)
| DEEP Cage Impact 2016
| 
| align=center| 1
| align=center| 0:35
| Tokyo, Japan
|
|-
| Loss
| align=center| 21–15
| Andy Main
| Submission (triangle choke)
| Pancrase 270
| 
| align=center| 4
| align=center| 3:41
| Tokyo, Japan
| 
|-
| Win
| align=center| 21–14
| Takumi Nakayama
| Decision (split)
| Pancrase 264
| 
| align=center| 3
| align=center| 5:00
| Tokyo, Japan
| 
|-
| Loss
| align=center| 20–14
| Mike Richman
| KO (punches)
| Bellator 131
| 
| align=center| 1
| align=center| 0:46
| San Diego, California, United States
|
|-
| Win
| align=center| 20–13
| Yuki Baba
| Submission (rear-naked choke)
| Pancrase 261
| 
| align=center| 1
| align=center| 4:05
| Tokyo, Japan
| 
|-
| Win
| align=center| 19–13
| Kenichi Ito
| TKO (punches)
| Grandslam MMA: Way of the Cage
| 
| align=center| 1
| align=center| 4:27
| Tokyo, Japan
| 
|-
| Loss
| align=center| 18–13
| Vaughan Lee
| Decision (unanimous)
| The Ultimate Fighter China Finale: Kim vs. Hathaway
| 
| align=center| 3
| align=center| 5:00
| Macau, SAR, China
| 
|-
| Loss
| align=center| 18–12
| Takeya Mizugaki
| Decision (unanimous)
| UFC Fight Night: Hunt vs. Bigfoot
| 
| align=center| 3
| align=center| 5:00
| Brisbane, Queensland, Australia
| 
|-
| Loss
| align=center| 18–11
| Dennis Siver
| Decision (unanimous)
| UFC on Fox: Henderson vs. Diaz
| 
| align=center| 3
| align=center| 5:00
| Seattle, Washington, United States
| 
|-
| Win
| align=center| 18–10
| Cole Miller
| Decision (split)
| UFC on Fox: Shogun vs. Vera
| 
| align=center| 3
| align=center| 5:00
| Los Angeles, California, United States
| 
|-
| Loss
| align=center| 17–10
| Jimy Hettes
| Decision (unanimous)
| UFC 141
| 
| align=center| 3
| align=center| 5:00
| Las Vegas, Nevada, United States
| 
|-
| Win
| align=center| 17–9
| Leonard Garcia
| Decision (unanimous)
| UFC 136
| 
| align=center| 3
| align=center| 5:00
| Houston, Texas, United States
| 
|-
| Loss
| align=center| 16–9
| Mike Brown
| Decision (unanimous)
| UFC 133
| 
| align=center| 3
| align=center| 5:00
| Philadelphia, Pennsylvania, United States
| 
|-
| Loss
| align=center| 16–8
| Leonard Garcia
| Decision (split)
| The Ultimate Fighter: Team GSP vs. Team Koscheck Finale
| 
| align=center| 3
| align=center| 5:00
| Las Vegas, Nevada, United States
| 
|-
| Win
| align=center| 16–7
| Rodney Rhoden
| Submission (armbar)
| Civic Disobedience 2
| 
| align=center| 1
| align=center| 3:20
| Los Angeles, California, United States
| 
|-
| Loss
| align=center| 15–7
| Isaac DeJesus
| TKO (punches)
| TPF 3: Champions Collide
| 
| align=center| 1
| align=center| 2:55
| Lemoore, California, United States
| 
|-
| Loss
| align=center| 15–6
| Michihiro Omigawa
| TKO (punches)
| World Victory Road Presents: Sengoku 8
| 
| align=center| 1
| align=center| 4:52
| Tokyo, Japan
| 
|-
| Win
| align=center| 15–5
| Hideki Kadowaki
| TKO (punches)
| World Victory Road Presents: Sengoku 7
| 
| align=center| 1
| align=center| 3:09
| Tokyo, Japan
| 
|-
| Loss
| align=center| 14–5
| Billy Evangelista
| Decision (split)
| Strikeforce: Melendez vs. Thomson
| 
| align=center| 3
| align=center| 5:00
| San Jose, California, United States
| 
|-
| Win
| align=center| 14–4
| Saad Awad
| TKO (punches)
| GC 74: Evolution
| 
| align=center| 2
| align=center| 0:52
| Los Angeles, California, United States
| 
|-
| Win
| align=center| 13–4
| Shad Smith
| TKO (punches)
| EFWC: The Untamed
| 
| align=center| 1
| align=center| 1:11
| Anaheim, California, United States
| 
|-
| Loss
| align=center| 12–4
| Gesias Cavalcante
| TKO (punches)
| Dynamite!! USA
| 
| align=center| 1
| align=center| 0:26
| Los Angeles, California, United States
| 
|-
| Loss
| align=center| 12–3
| Josh Thomson
| Decision (unanimous)
| Strikeforce: Triple Threat
| 
| align=center| 3
| align=center| 5:00
| San Jose, California, United States
| 
|-
| Win
| align=center| 12–2
| Aric Nelson
| TKO (punches)
| FCP: Malice at Cow Palace
| 
| align=center| 2
| align=center| 4:11
| San Jacinto, California, United States
| 
|-
| Win
| align=center| 11–2
| Ryan Diaz
| Decision (split)
| KOTC: Rapid Fire
| 
| align=center| 2
| align=center| 5:00
| San Jacinto, California, United States
| 
|-
| Win
| align=center| 10–2
| Albert Hill
| Submission (armbar)
| KOTC 63: Final Conflict
| 
| align=center| 1
| align=center| 0:12
| San Jacinto, California, United States
| 
|-
| Win
| align=center| 9–2
| Joe Frainee
| Submission (armbar)
| KOTC 58: Prime Time
| 
| align=center| 1
| align=center| 3:28
| San Jacinto, California, United States
| 
|-
| Win
| align=center| 8–2
| Sost Infante
| TKO (cut)
| KOTC 54: Mucho Machismo
| 
| align=center| 1
| align=center| 0:51
| San Jacinto, California, United States
| 
|-
| Win
| align=center| 7–2
| Joey Alvarado
| KO (punches)
| KOTC 49: Soboba
| 
| align=center| 1
| align=center| 1:08
| San Jacinto, California, United States
| 
|-
| Win
| align=center| 6–2
| Mike Valdez
| Submission (triangle choke)
| KOTC 47: Uprising
| 
| align=center| 1
| align=center| 0:41
| Lemoore, California, United States
| 
|-
| Loss
| align=center| 5–2
| Nick Ertl
| Decision (split)
| WEC 11
| 
| align=center| 3
| align=center| 5:00
| Upland, California, United States
| 
|-
| Win
| align=center| 5–1
| Eben Kaneshiro
| Decision (unanimous)
| Pit Fighting Championship
| 
| align=center| 3
| align=center| 5:00
| Upland, California, United States
| 
|-
| Loss
| align=center| 4–1
| Rob McCullough
| Decision (unanimous)
| PFC: Knucklefest
| 
| align=center| 2
| align=center| 5:00
| California, United States
| 
|-
| Win
| align=center| 4–0
| Patrick Hoang
| Decision (unanimous)
| PFC: Knucklefest
| 
| align=center| 1
| align=center| 5:00
| California, United States
| 
|-
| Win
| align=center| 3–0
| Brad Levy
| Decision (split)
| PFC: Knucklefest
| 
| align=center| 1
| align=center| 5:00
| California, United States
| 
|-
| Win
| align=center| 2–0
| Brad McCall
| Submission (guillotine choke)
| California Pancration Championships
| 
| align=center| 2
| align=center| 0:42
| Los Angeles, California, United States
| 
|-
| Win
| align=center| 1–0
| Jason Maxwell
| TKO (punches)
| Cobra Classic 2001
| 
| align=center| 2
| align=center| N/A
| Anza, California, United States
|

See also 
 List of male mixed martial artists

References

External links
Official UFC Profile
 
 
 

American male mixed martial artists
Mixed martial artists from California
Bantamweight mixed martial artists
Featherweight mixed martial artists
Lightweight mixed martial artists
Boxers from California
Light-middleweight boxers
American practitioners of Brazilian jiu-jitsu
People awarded a black belt in Brazilian jiu-jitsu
American male karateka
Mixed martial artists utilizing taekwondo
Mixed martial artists utilizing karate
Mixed martial artists utilizing judo
Mixed martial artists utilizing boxing
Mixed martial artists utilizing Brazilian jiu-jitsu
1983 births
Living people
American sportspeople of Vietnamese descent
Sportspeople of Vietnamese descent
People from Westminster, California
American male boxers
Ultimate Fighting Championship male fighters